The municipality of La Floresta is one of the municipalities of Canelones Department, Uruguay, established on 15 March 2010. Its seat is the city of La Floresta.

History 
The municipality was created by the provision of Law No. 18653 of 15 March 2010, as part of Canelones Department, and it includes the CLB and CLC constituencies.

Location 
The municipality lies at the southeast side of the Canelones Department. The main activity of the municipality is tourism, as it is made up of a chain of spas on the Río de la Plata. 

Its area is 65.5 km². The census localities that make it up, had a population of 7,310 inhabitants, in 2011.

Localities 
 Las Vegas
 La Floresta
 Estación La Floresta
 Costa Azul
 Bello Horizonte
 Guazuvirá
 San Luis
 Los Titanes
 La Tuna
 Araminda
 Santa Lucía del Este
 Biarritz
 Cuchilla Alta
 El Galeón
 Santa Ana
 Balneario Argentino
 Jaureguiberry

References

La Floresta